The 1958 International Cross Country Championships was held in Cardiff, Wales, at the Pontcanna Fields on 22 March 1958. Tunisia entered a team for the first time after gaining independence.  A report on the event was given in the Glasgow Herald.

Complete results, medallists, 
 and the results of British athletes were published.

Medallists

Individual Race Results

Men's (9 mi / 14.5 km)

Team Results

Men's

Participation
An unofficial count yields the participation of 78 athletes from 9 countries.

 (9)
 (9)
 (9)
 (9)
 (7)
 (9)
 (8)
 (9)
 (9)

See also
 1958 in athletics (track and field)

References

International Cross Country Championships
International Cross Country Championships
Cross
International Cross Country Championships
Cross country running in the United Kingdom
Sports competitions in Cardiff
International Cross Country Championships, 1958
International Cross Country Championships